Peter Bastian (25 August 1943 in Copenhagen – 27 March 2017) was a Danish musician. He was educated in theoretical physics and classical bassoon. He was a member of The Danish Wind Quintet (Den Danske Blæserkvintet) and the Danish band Bazaar. In 1998 he was knighted in the Order of the Dannebrog. He is the author of two books published by Gyldendal, "Ind i Musikken" 1987 and "Mesterlære – en livsfortælling" 2011.

References

1943 births
2017 deaths
Knights of the Order of the Dannebrog
Musicians from Copenhagen
Danish classical bassoonists
20th-century classical musicians
21st-century classical musicians